Etiella hobsoni is a species of snout moth in the genus Etiella. It was described by Arthur Gardiner Butler in 1881. It is found in Australia and Indonesia.

The larvae are podborers of soybean.

References

Moths described in 1881
Phycitini